The Subcommittee on Crime and Federal Government Surveillance is a subcommittee within the House Judiciary Committee. It was previously known as the Subcommittee on Crime, Terrorism and Homeland Security.

Jurisdiction
The Federal Criminal Code, the administration of justice, federal prosecutors, drug enforcement, sentencing, internal and homeland security, the Federal Rules of Criminal Procedure, the use of surveillance tools by federal law enforcement, and prisons.

Members, 118th Congress
To be confirmed.

Historical membership rosters

115th Congress

116th Congress

See also
  United States House Committee on the Judiciary

References

External links 
 Subcommittee page

Judiciary Crime, Terrorism, Homeland Security and Investigations